Gynenica is a genus of stink bug with about fourteen species in the Afrotropical and Oriental regions. It is one of four genera placed in the tribe Lestonocorini along with Lestonocoris, Neogynenica, and Umgababa that occur in Africa and India and feed on plants in the family Acanthaceae. Bugs in the genus have the pronotum tips extended into forward and upward curving spines. The scutellum is longer than broad, the apex with a rounded point and not reaching beyond the middle of the abdomen.

Species in the genus include:
 Gynenica affinis 
 Gynenica alami 
 Gynenica basilewskyi 
 Gynenica capeneri 
 Gynenica carayoni 
 Gynenica chinai 
 Gynenica funerea 
 Gynenica ghaurii 
 Gynenica kavirondo 
 Gynenica malaisi 
 Gynenica marginella 
 Gynenica occidentalis 
 Gynenica rustica 
 Gynenica tellini 
 Gynenica vicaria

References 

Pentatominae
Pentatomidae genera